Robertson County is a county in the U.S. state of Texas. As of the 2020 census, its population was 16,757. Its county seat is Franklin. The county was created in 1837 and organized the following year. It is named for Sterling C. Robertson, an early settler who signed the Texas Declaration of Independence.

Robertson County is in east-central Texas and is part of the College Station-Bryan, TX metropolitan statistical area.

Geography

Major highways
  U.S. Highway 79
  U.S. Highway 190
  State Highway 6
  State Highway 7
  State Highway 14

Additionally, State Highway OSR forms Robertson County's southeastern border, but does not fully enter the county.

Adjacent counties
 Limestone County (north)
 Leon County (northeast)
 Brazos County (southeast)
 Burleson County (south)
 Milam County (southwest)
 Falls County (northwest)

Demographics

Note: the US Census treats Hispanic/Latino as an ethnic category. This table excludes Latinos from the racial categories and assigns them to a separate category. Hispanics/Latinos can be of any race.

As of the census of 2000,  16,000 people, 6,179 households, and 4,356 families were residing in the county.  The population density was 19 people/sq mi (7/km2).  The 7,874 housing units  averaged 9/sq mi (4/km2).  The racial makeup of the county was 66.20% White, 24.19% African American, 0.42% Native American, 0.16% Asian,  7.22% from other races, and 1.79% from two or more races.  About 14.74% of the population were Hispanics or Latinos of any race.

Of the 6,179 households, 32.00% had children under  18 living with them, 51.10% were married couples living together, 15.50% had a female householder with no husband present, and 29.50% were not families. About 26.90% of all households were made up of individuals, and 14.50% had someone living alone who was 65  or older.  The average household size was 2.55, and the average family size was 3.09.

In the county, the age distribution was 28.20% under 18, 7.50% from 18 to 24, 24.20% from 25 to 44, 23.10% from 45 to 64, and 17.00% who were 65 or older.  The median age was 38 years. For every 100 females, there were 91.00 males.  For every 100 females age 18 and over, there were 87.70 males.

The median income for a household in the county was $28,886, and for a family was $35,590. Males had a median income of $30,795 versus $21,529 for females. The per capita income for the county was $14,714.  About 17.30% of families and 20.60% of the population were below the poverty line, including 28.70% of those under age 18 and 21.60% of those age 65 or over.

Communities

Cities
 Bremond
 Calvert
 Franklin (county seat)
 Hearne

Unincorporated communities

 Bald Prairie
 Benchley (partly in Brazos County)
 Easterly
 Elliott
 Hammond
 Mumford
 New Baden
 Ridge
 Tidwell Prairie
 Valley Junction
 Wheelock

Ghost towns
 Owensville

Politics
Robertson County was a longtime Democratic stronghold, like many rural Southern counties were in the Jim Crow and immediate post-Jim Crow eras. (It only voted for a Republican in 1972.) In 2000, the last time the county went to a Democrat (Al Gore), it was one of only three majority-white rural counties (with Newton and Morris) to vote for Bill Clinton's former vice president. None of the three have gone to a Democrat since.

Education
School districts:
 Bremond Independent School District
 Bryan Independent School District
 Calvert Independent School District
 Franklin Independent School District
 Groesbeck Independent School District
 Hearne Independent School District
 Leon Independent School District
 Mumford Independent School District

Blinn College is the designated community college for portions of the county in Bryan, Franklin, Hearne, and Mumford ISDs. Portions in Bremond ISD and Calvert ISD are zoned to the McLennan Community College District.

See also

 National Register of Historic Places listings in Robertson County, Texas
 Recorded Texas Historic Landmarks in Robertson County

References

External links

 Robertson County government's website
 
 Sketch of  Sterling Robertson from A pictorial history of Texas, from the earliest visits of European adventurers, to A.D. 1879, hosted by the Portal to Texas History.

 
1837 establishments in the Republic of Texas
Populated places established in 1837
Bryan–College Station